Sandra Milena Lemos Rivas (born 1 January 1989 in Pradera, Valle del Cauca) is a Colombian athlete. Her last name is commonly spelled Lemus. She competed for Colombia in shot put at the 2012 Summer Olympics failing to reach the final.

Personal life
She is the sister of decathlete José Gregorio Lemos, and mother of three children from the relation with judoka Luis Salazar.

Personal bests
Shot put: 18.03 m –  Uberlândia, 16 May 2013
Discus throw: 52.90 m –  San Germán, 18 February 2012

Competition record

References

External links

Sports reference biography

Colombian female shot putters
Athletes (track and field) at the 2012 Summer Olympics
Athletes (track and field) at the 2016 Summer Olympics
Olympic athletes of Colombia
1989 births
Living people
South American Games bronze medalists for Colombia
South American Games medalists in athletics
Competitors at the 2014 South American Games
Central American and Caribbean Games bronze medalists for Colombia
Competitors at the 2014 Central American and Caribbean Games
Central American and Caribbean Games medalists in athletics
Sportspeople from Valle del Cauca Department
21st-century Colombian women